Legislative elections were held in France on 21 June. Only citizens paying taxes were eligible to vote.

Results

Aftermath
Louis-Philippe of France dissolved the legislature on 3 October 1837.

References

Legislative elections in France
France
Legislative
France